Peter Zauner (born 30 May 1983) is a retired Austrian badminton player from ASKÖ Traun club who won National Championships for 13 times.

Zauner became the National Junior Champion in 2001. Five further junior titles followed from 2003 to 2005. In 2005 he also won the adult category for the first time and won the Hungarian International and Slovak International. In 2006 he won the Austrian International, 2009 the Slovenian International and 2010 the Romanian International. Zauner ended his international career in 2014. Since 2018 he has been the sports coordinator of the Upper Austrian Badminton Association. In addition, he also studied Marketing Studies from Steyr in Austria. He and his partner Jürgen Koch dominated the Austrian badminton for nearly 25 years. They were one of the strongest doubles pair Austria has produced who reached highest world ranking of 22 in their peak period. Zauner won Austrian national championships for 13 times, two times in singles; eleven times in men's doubles (with Harald Koch and Jürgen Koch).

Achievements

BWF Grand Prix 
The BWF Grand Prix has two level such as Grand Prix and Grand Prix Gold. It is a series of badminton tournaments, sanctioned by Badminton World Federation (BWF) since 2007.

Men's doubles

BWF/IBF International 
Men's doubles

Mixed doubles

 BWF International Challenge tournament
 BWF/IBF International Series tournament

References 

1983 births
Living people
Austrian male badminton players
People from Ried im Innkreis District
Sportspeople from Upper Austria